Kosmos 320 ( meaning Cosmos 320), also known as DS-MO No.3 was a technology demonstration satellite which was launched by the Soviet Union in 1970 as part of the Dnepropetrovsk Sputnik programme. Its primary mission was to demonstrate orientation control by means of an aerodynamic skirt stabiliser. It also carried an optical research payload for the Soviet Armed Forces.

Launch 
It was launched aboard a Kosmos-2I 63SM rocket from Site 86/4 at Kapustin Yar. The launch occurred at 10:59:58 UTC on 16 January 1970.

Orbit 
It decayed from orbit on 10 February 1970. Kosmos 320 was the second of two DS-MO satellites to be launched. It was preceded by Kosmos 149, which was launched in March 1967.

References

Kosmos satellites
Spacecraft launched in 1970
1970 in the Soviet Union
Dnepropetrovsk Sputnik program